Tosh Lupoi (born July 22, 1981) is an American football coach who is the defensive coordinator and linebackers coach at the University of Oregon. He previously served as the defensive line coach for the Jacksonville Jaguars in 2021, the defensive line and run game coordinator for the Atlanta Falcons in 2020, the defensive line coach for the Cleveland Browns in 2019 and the defensive coordinator and outside linebackers coach at the University of Alabama from 2017 to 2018.

Playing career
As a player, Lupoi was a defensive lineman for Cal from 2000-05. He led the Bears' defensive line in tackles in 2003 and earned Pac-10 All-Academic recognition in 2005.

Coaching career

University of California, Berkeley
In 2008, Lupoi was hired as a defensive line coach at his alma mater, University of California, Berkeley. During his time as a Cal coach, Lupoi developed a reputation as an elite recruiter. In 2010, Lupoi was suspended for his role in instructing nose tackle Aaron Tipoti to fake an injury in a game against Oregon to try to slow down Oregon's fast, up-tempo offense. He left Cal amid controversy after he allegedly used his position as a Cal recruiter to convince elite recruits to commit to the University of Washington—where he intended to become a coach.

University of Washington
Following his departure from California, Lupoi served as the defensive line coach for University of Washington from 2012 to 2013. During his tenure, Lupoi was investigated and suspended for allegedly paying $4,500 to an associate of a recruit, though the matter was ultimately dismissed and deemed false. Head coach Steve Sarkisian elected not to rehire Lupoi when he left Washington to become the coach at USC. The new Washington head coach Chris Petersen also refused to hire him.

University of Alabama
Lupoi joined the Crimson Tide staff as a defensive analyst in 2014  and coached the outside linebackers in 2015. He added the title of co-defensive coordinator prior to the 2016 season and served as defensive coordinator in 2018. During his time at Alabama, the Crimson Tide qualified for the College Football Playoffs all five seasons, advanced to the National Championship game four times and captured two national titles (2015 and 2017). During his time as coordinator, Alabama led the nation in scoring defense in 2016 (13.0 ppg) and 2017 (11.9). The school also finished second in the nation in total defense in 2016 (260.4 ypg) and 2017 (261.8 ypg). Lupoi worked with several players who went on to be first-round picks in the NFL, including DE Jonathan Allen, LB Reuben Foster, S Minkah Fitzpatrick, NT Daron Payne and LB Rashaan Evans.

Cleveland Browns
On January 18, 2019, Lupoi was hired by the Cleveland Browns as their defensive line coach under head coach Freddie Kitchens.

Atlanta Falcons
On January 11, 2020, Lupoi was hired by the Atlanta Falcons as their defensive line coach and run game coordinator under head coach Dan Quinn.

Jacksonville Jaguars
On February 11, 2021, Lupoi was hired by the Jacksonville Jaguars as their defensive line coach under head coach Urban Meyer.

Oregon Ducks 
On January 10, 2022, Lupoi was hired by the Oregon Ducks as their defensive coordinator and linebackers coach under head coach Dan Lanning.

References

External links
 Atlanta Falcons bio
 Alabama Crimson Tide bio

1981 births
Living people
Alabama Crimson Tide football coaches
Atlanta Falcons coaches
California Golden Bears football coaches
California Golden Bears football players
Cleveland Browns coaches
Jacksonville Jaguars coaches
Oregon Ducks football coaches
Washington Huskies football coaches
Coaches of American football from California
De La Salle High School (Concord, California) alumni